Svedana or Swedana, means to "perspire". It is used in Ayurvedic treatment. It is also called as steam therapy.  There are different types of swedana. Sitting in sun is also called as swedana. Swedana is a pre procedure for Panchakarma. Snehana and Swedana are pre procedures for Panchakarma. An herbal combination is sometimes added to the steam for medicinal effect.

References 

Ayurveda
Balneotherapy

de:Stirnölguss